Sarbinowo  is a village in the administrative district of Gmina Dębno, within Myślibórz County, West Pomeranian Voivodeship, in north-western Poland. The village has a population of 490.

Originally a West Slavic settlement, the village was first mentioned in 1261 as Torbarmstorp, a possession of the Knights Templar. By 1335 it was known as Tzorbensdorf in the Neumark region of the Margraviate of Brandenburg. In 1540 it fell to John, Margrave of Brandenburg-Küstrin. It was the scene of the Battle of Zorndorf, in which the Prussians under Frederick the Great fought the Russians commanded by William Fermor, on August 25, 1758. The battle was one of the bloodiest battles of the Seven Years' War. Zorndorf became part of the Province of Brandenburg in 1815 and the German Empire in 1871. 

After Germany's defeat in World War II it became part of Poland.

References

Villages in Myślibórz County